Stigmella fervida is a moth of the family Nepticulidae. It is found in Russia (Primorskiy Kray) and China (Heilongjiang).

There are two generations per year. Adults are on wing in June–July and again in spring, although this second generation is only from larvae.

The larvae feed on Quercus mongolica. They mine the leaves of their host plant. The mine consists of an extremely contorted gallery, doubling back several times, closely following the earlier track, thus forming a brown dot. The leaf surrounding the mine stains pale brown. Later, the mine widens, but continues to double back, only in its final part it may follow a looser course. The mine only rarely crosses a vein.

External links
Nepticulidae (Lepidoptera) in China, 1. Introduction and Stigmella (Schrank) feeding on Fagaceae

Nepticulidae
Moths described in 1984
Moths of Asia